Enteromius mohasicus is a species of ray-finned fish in the genus Enteromius which occurs in Lake Muhazi and Lake Kivu in central Africa.

References

Enteromius
Taxa named by Paul Pappenheim
Fish described in 1914